Cordell Hull Reagon (February 22, 1943 – November 12, 1996) was an American singer and activist. He was the founding member of The Freedom Singers of the Student Nonviolent Coordinating Committee (SNCC), a leader of the Albany Movement and a Freedom Rider during the Civil Rights Movement.

Early life
Reagon was born in Nashville, Tennessee, and was named for Cordell Hull, the Secretary of State under President Franklin D. Roosevelt from 1933 to 1944.  Reagon's powerful tenor voice spread the message of the civil rights movement throughout the United States and Canada in the 1960s.

Activism and music career
Reagon was 16 years of age in 1959 when he emerged as a leader of the civil rights movement in Albany, Georgia. James Forman, who became the executive secretary of SNCC, called him "the baby of the movement." Reagon, who was arrested more than thirty times in the South for his anti-segregation activities, conducted nonviolent training workshops for hundreds of volunteers who journeyed to the South to work on voter registration campaigns and other civil rights projects.

In 1962, at the encouragement of friend Pete Seeger,  Reagon founded The Freedom Singers, a quartet of two men and two women who sang gospel-style freedom songs to rouse support for the civil rights movement. The songs brought the struggle for civil rights and its activities to a wide audience. The people involved were already singers—in church choirs, in schools, including his first wife, Bernice. Organizing the music simply tapped into the singing energy of the community and gave struggle a focus.

In the late 1960s and early 1970s, Reagon became active in the movements against the Vietnam War, nuclear weapons, and environmental destruction. From 1965 until 1988 he lived in New York City with his second wife, Merble Reagon and worked as an organizer for the Social Service Employees Union, Mobilization for Survival, was a youth worker for Mobilization for Youth and a career and vocational counselor. In 1988 he moved to Berkeley, where he founded the environmental group Urban Habitat and Urban Justice Organization.

Cordell Reagon remained an activist until his 1996 death at age 53 in his Berkeley, California, apartment, the victim of a still-unsolved homicide.

Personal
Reagon's two marriages—to Bernice Johnson Reagon of Albany, Georgia, and to Merble Harrington Reagon of New York, New York, ended in divorce. One of his children is Toshi Reagon; one of his sisters is Meryle Joy Reagon.

References

External links
 SNCC Digital Gateway: Cordell Reagon, Documentary website created by the SNCC Legacy Project and Duke University, telling the story of the Student Nonviolent Coordinating Committee & grassroots organizing from the inside-out
Civil Rights Digital Library: Cordell Reagon
The Organizing Role of Music in the Civil Rights Movement
 ABC News Our World "Up Against the Wall-Summer 1961" Cordell Reagon interview at 0:40:15

1943 births
1996 deaths
Freedom Riders
American civil rights activists
American folk singers
American gospel singers
Student Nonviolent Coordinating Committee
20th-century American singers
20th-century American male singers